is a district located a few kilometres south of Shinagawa, Tokyo, Japan accessed by rail via the Keihin Tohoku line, or by road via Dai Ichi Keihin.  Ōmorikaigan, the eastern area of Ōmori, can be reached via the Keikyu line.

Ōmori is one of many areas in Tokyo's largest ward, Ōta-ku, and was formerly home to the German International School before its relocation to Yokohama. High quality residential and retail developments that the German school attracted are present in the Ōmori-sannō area.  Ōmori is home to the headquarters of the automotive company Isuzu, which has offices in the Belport complex a few hundred metres from Ōmori station.

Prior to its development as a residential and business location, Ōmori was laced with a network of small rivers which were used by many locals for drying harvested nori (seaweed), a staple of the Japanese diet.  Modern Ōmori is built on mostly reclaimed land, and is very much a traditional Shinto area.  There are many Shinto shrines in the area, and during the August o-bon festival, mikoshi parades are very common.

Ōmori-sannō, to the west of Ōmori station, is an upscale neighbourhood compared to the other side of the tracks.  The area is known for the poets, philosophers, and writers who made their homes there.

World War II POW Camp 
Ōmori was the site of an Imperial Japanese Army-administered prisoner-of-war camp during World War II. The inhumane conditions in the camp were described in detail in the book Unbroken: A World War II Story of Survival, Resilience, and Redemption describing the life of American Olympic Athlete Louis Zamperini. The camp was brutal, and included in its staff was known war criminal Mutsuhiro Watanabe. However, US Navy submarine commander Richard O'Kane found Omori camp harsh, but essentially correct in administration, particularly compared with the Ōfuna Imperial Japanese Navy detention centre. Local anti-militarist Japanese civilians sometimes helped the prisoners with small gifts of food.

Two Omoris 

Ōmori has two meanings:
 Area around JR Ōmori station.
 Town of Ōmori.
While Ōmori station opened in 1876 and is widely known to outsiders, the "town of Ōmori" was renamed in 1970 and is less known, and even local residents are often confused.  Broadly, the west side of JR Ōmori station is still Ōmori but generally speaking it is considered Sannō area, an uptown.

Education 

Ota operates the public elementary and junior high schools in Ōmori.

Tokyo Metropolitan Government Board of Education operates Ōmori High School

Private high schools include Tokyo High School.

Parks 

 Heiwa-no-mori Park. Largest park in Ota-ku (99,000 m2)
 Heiwajima Park. Includes: baseball ground; barbecue park (2,200 yen for ward residents, 2,600); swimming pool (inside and outside)
 Ōmori-furusato-no-hamabe Park. Maritime park. Local elementary school children call it "Furuhama". Particulars:  Free entrance; Closed at night; Fishing is allowed in the rocky stretch of water; Campfires are not allowed; Benches and some tables available; Drinking water; Toilets and no showers; The chlorine count usually exceeds the "suitable to swim" level so swimming is prohibited); No shade from sun, and unlike Odaiba beach, there is no shops around the beach; Parking lot is not near.

References

External links

 Map of Omori Area and Sanno, Magome and Ikegami Areas from Ota-ku's ward official website.
 Sports Facilities

Neighborhoods of Tokyo
Ōta, Tokyo
Japanese prisoner of war and internment camps